El Toro Loco (Spanish for "The Crazy Bull") is a monster truck currently racing in the Monster Jam series. The truck was created in 2001 as a variant of the 3-D molded body of the Bulldozer design, but as El Toro Loco has increased in popularity, it has become the primary truck for the body style. The truck is commonly known for "snorting" smoke out of its nose, which is toggled by a button inside the truck.

History
The truck was created by SFX and PACE Motorsports, the then-parents of Monster Jam, in 2001, as a spin-off of the Bulldozer design for driver Lupe Soza, who had previously owned and driven Warrior from the 1980s. The truck became instantly popular with kids, and has since become a leading merchandise seller.

In 2003, the truck made its first Monster Jam World Finals appearance with Soza. Although its racing results were disappointing, Soza's freestyle run was lauded as exceptional and he finished second overall.

In 2004, Soza driving El Toro Loco was a Monster Jam World Finals freestyle co-champion with Madusa driven by Debrah Miceli, and Maximum Destruction driven by Tom Meents, all tied with a score of 31.

By 2013, with the truck being one of the top merchandise sellers on the series, multiple El Toro Loco trucks have been run simultaneously on separate tours, with a variety of drivers, including notably Marc McDonald, who succeeded Soza as the lead driver, and Chuck Werner. Variations of the design in black and yellow have been used to distinguish the different trucks when necessary.

Drivers

Current Drivers 
 Marc McDonald (since 2007-2023)
 Chuck Werner (since 2010-2023)
 Armando Castro (since 2017)
 Mikey Cahill (since 2018)
 "Diesel Dave" Kiley (since 2018)
 Elvis Lainez (since 2019)
 Brandon Arthur (2023-present) 
 Jamey Garner (2023-present)

Former drivers 
 Lupe Soza (2001–09, 2014–15)
 Nathan Weenk (2008)
 Paul Cohen (2008)
 Chris Baker (2009–11)
 Ryan Huffaker (2012)
 Aaron Basl (2012–13)
 Bari Musawwir (2011)
 Joey Parnell (2011)
 Dan Radoni (2013)
 Dan Evans (on one occasion)
 Tristan England (on one occasion)
 Morgan Kane (on one occasion)
 Macey Nitcher (on one occasion)
 Collete Davis (2017)
 Kayla Blood (2016–19)
 Scott Buetow (2019–2020)
 Becky McDonough (2012–2021)
 Mark List (since 2015)

Monster Jam World Finals Championships and Accomplishments
Monster Jam World Finals 4 (March 22, 2003):
Racing: lost in Round 1 to Blacksmith driven by Carl Van Horn
Freestyle: 36 - 2nd Place
Monster Jam World Finals 5 (March 20, 2004):
Racing: lost in Round 1 to King Krunch driven by David Smith (after crashing in the turn)
Freestyle: tied for co-freestyle championship with 31 - 1st Place
Monster Jam World Finals 6 (March 19, 2005):
Racing: lost in Quarter-Finals to Madusa driven by Madusa
Freestyle: 8 - 19th Place
Monster Jam World Finals 7 (March 25, 2006):
Racing: lost in Round 2 to Pastrana 199 driven by Chad Tingler
Freestyle: 11 - 23rd Place
Monster Jam World Finals 8 (March 24, 2007):
Racing: lost in Round 1 to Monster Mutt Dalmatian driven by Chad Tingler
Freestyle: 11 - 16th Place 
Monster Jam World Finals 9 (March 29, 2008):
Racing: lost in Round 1 to Black Stallion driven by Michael Vaters
Freestyle: 28 - 7th Place
Monster Jam World Finals 10 (March 28, 2009):
Racing: lost in Round 2 to Blue Thunder driven by Linsey Weenk 
Freestyle: 20 - 14th Place
Advance Auto Parts MONSTER JAM World Finals 11 (March 27, 2010):
Racing: lost in semi-finals to Grave Digger #20 driven by Dennis Anderson
Freestyle: DNF - Broken front axle housing and 4-links 
Advance Auto Parts MONSTER JAM World Finals 12 (March 24, 2011):
Racing: lost in Round 3 to Lucas Oil CRUSADER driven by Linsey Weenk
Freestyle: 27 - 7th Place 
Advance Auto Parts MONSTER JAM World Finals 13 (March 23, 2012):
Racing: lost in Round 2 to Maximum Destruction driven by Tom Meents
Freestyle: 27 - 7th Place 
Advance Auto Parts MONSTER JAM World Finals 14 (March 22, 2013):
Racing: lost in Championship Race to Grave Digger the Legend driven by Adam Anderson
Freestyle: 20 - 18th Place
Monster Jam World Finals 15 (March 20, 2014):
Racing: lost in Round 2 to Monster Energy driven by Damon Bradshaw
Freestyle: 32.5 - 4th Place
Monster Jam World Finals 16 (March 18, 2015):
Racing: lost in Round 2 to Monster Energy driven by Coty Saucier
Freestyle: 29 - 7th Place
Monster Jam World Finals 17 (March 24, 2016):
Racing: lost in Round 2 to Son-uva Digger driven by Ryan Anderson
Freestyle: 28.5 - 9th Place
Monster Jam World Finals 18 (March 23, 2017, Marc McDonald):
Racing: lost in Round 2 to Monster Energy driven by Coty Saucier
Freestyle: 7.163 - 16th Place
Monster Jam World Finals 18 (March 23, 2017, Becky McDonough):
Racing: lost in Round 1 to Max-D driven by Colton Eichelberger
Freestyle: 7.073 - 20th Place
Monster Jam World Finals 19 (March 23, 2018):
Racing: lost in Round 1 to Grave Digger driven by Morgan Kane
Freestyle: 6.856 - 15th Place
Monster Jam World Finals 20 (May 10th-11th, 2019, Mark List, Armando Castro Scott Buetow, and Becky Mcdonough):
Showdown: (List) lost in Round 1 to Scooby-Doo! driven by Linsey Read
Two-Wheel-Skills: (Castro) 8.533 - 5th place
Racing: (Mcdonough): lost in Round 1 to Lucas Oil Crusader driven by Lisney Weenk
High Jump: (Buetow) jumped 45.124 ft - 4th place
Freestyle: (Mcdonough) 7.637 - 13th place

See also
 Monster Truck
 List of Monster Trucks

References

Monster trucks
Off-road vehicles
Sports entertainment
Vehicles introduced in 2001